Bagerhat-3 is a constituency represented in the Jatiya Sangsad (National Parliament) of Bangladesh since 2018 by Habibun Nahar of the Awami League.

Boundaries 
The constituency encompasses Mongla and Rampal upazilas.

History 
The constituency was created in 1984 from a Khulna constituency when the former Khulna District was split into three districts: Bagerhat, Khulna, and Satkhira.

Members of Parliament

Elections

Elections in the 2010s 
To run for mayor of Khulna, Talukder Abdul Khaleque resigned from parliament on 10 April 2018. Habibun Nahar, his wife, was elected unopposed on 4 June, as she was the only candidate in the by-election scheduled for later that month.

Talukder Abdul Khaleque was elected unopposed in the 2014 general election after opposition parties withdrew their candidacies in a boycott of the election.

Elections in the 2000s

Elections in the 1990s

References

External links
 

Parliamentary constituencies in Bangladesh
Bagerhat District